James William O'Halloran (born October 20, 1984) is an Australian model and actor best known as the second male model on the U.S. TV show The Price Is Right. He was born in Melbourne, Australia. James currently resides in Los Angeles.

In 2014, he moved to the U.S. and participated in a nationwide casting call, which he won. He became the second male model (following Robert Scott Wilson) on The Price Is Right, beating fellow finalists Jay Byars and Jonathan Morgan.

James began his acting career in Australia appearing in Twentysomething, Offspring and INXS: Never Tear Us Apart. He also played lead roles in the feature films Cynthia and Deadly Crush. He starred in The Late Late Show segment "Take a Break" with James Corden. He has also guest starred in The Young and the Restless, The Talk with Sharon Osbourne, Notorious, The Catch, and Criminal Minds: Beyond Borders.

James met his wife Jaimee Gooley at the Melbourne Cup in Australia. They married at a private estate on Australia's Mornington Peninsula on December 18, 2016.

James worked for three years as an industrial designer while taking nighttime acting classes. He eventually quit his job to become a model.

References

External links

1984 births
Australian male models
Australian male television actors
Game show models
Living people
Male actors from Melbourne